HMS Victorious is the second  of the Royal Navy. Victorious carries the Trident ballistic missile, the UK's nuclear deterrent.

Victorious was built at Barrow-in-Furness by Vickers Shipbuilding and Engineering Ltd, later BAE Systems Submarine Solutions, was launched in September 1993, and commissioned in January 1995.

Operational history

In November 2000, while travelling on the surface, Victorious grounded on Skelmorlie Bank in the upper Firth of Clyde in Scotland.

She became the second of the class to refit, during which time she was fitted with a Core H reactor ensuring that the boat will not need to refuel again until the end of its service life.  In 2008, she underwent sea trials before resuming patrols in 2009.

In 2013, Victorious completed the UK's 100th deterrent patrol by a Vanguard-class submarine.

In 2022, Victorious was forced to surface in the North Atlantic after a fire broke out in an electrical module. A Royal Navy spokesperson said the submarine was not actively deployed on a continuous at-sea deterrent (CASD) patrol, but was instead en route to the United States for a series of exercises. Victorious subsequently returned to her homebase in Faslane, Scotland.

Affiliations
The Highlanders, 4th Battalion Royal Regiment of Scotland

See also
 Letters of last resort
 List of submarines of the Royal Navy
 List of submarine classes of the Royal Navy
 Nuclear weapons and the United Kingdom
 Royal Navy Submarine Service
 Submarine-launched ballistic missile
 Trident nuclear programme

References

External links

 

Vanguard-class submarines
Ships built in Barrow-in-Furness
1993 ships
Submarines of the United Kingdom